The Pride of Britain Awards is an annual award ceremony which has taken place in the United Kingdom since May 1999 and first televised on ITV in April 2000.

The awards honour British people who have acted bravely or extraordinarily in challenging situations and have been presented solely by Carol Vorderman since 1999, and co-presented by Ashley Banjo since 2021. Banjo had previously featured as the show's "roving reporter".

History
The first Pride of Britain Awards were devised by Peter Willis, and held at the Dorchester Hotel in London in May 1999.  
They relocated to The London Studios in 2000, and then later relocated to the Grosvenor House Hotel from the 2011 award ceremony.

On 20 October 2021, it was announced that Ashley Banjo is to co-host the award ceremony with Carol Vorderman, beginning with the 23rd ceremony onwards.

Judges
The Pride of Britain Award winners are chosen by a panel of celebrities and well-known figures from a range of backgrounds, and has included multiple appearances by Simon Cowell, Richard Branson, Fiona Phillips, Christine Bleakley, Magdi Yacoub, Richard Wallace, Eamonn Holmes and Aled Jones, chaired from 1999 to 2004 by Piers Morgan and from 2005 to 2006 by Peter Willis, founder of the awards.

Sponsors
The awards are organised in association with the Daily Mirror, Lidl, ITV, Good Morning Britain and The Prince's Trust.

Scottish version
In November 2020, it was announced that STV, Reach plc (owners of Daily Record) and TSB had agreed a deal which sees the Scottish broadcaster commission STV Studios to produce the inaugural Daily Record Pride of Scotland Awards, in partnership with TSB. The 90-minute landmark TV event is already in production and is set to air on STV later in 2020. The deal represents the broadcaster's biggest ever advertiser-funded single programme.

Ceremonies

1999
The first Pride of Britain Awards took place on 20 May 1999, however was not televised. It was held at the Dorchester Hotel in London, which was the one and only time the awards were held there.

2000
The 2nd Pride of Britain Awards were televised on ITV on 12 April 2000. It was the first time the awards were televised and held at The London Studios.

2001
The 3rd Pride of Britain Awards were televised on ITV on 11 April 2001.

2002
The 4th Pride of Britain Awards were televised on ITV on 6 March 2002.

2003
The 5th Pride of Britain Awards were televised on ITV on 4 March 2003.

2004
The 6th Pride of Britain Awards were televised on ITV on 16 March 2004.

2005
The 7th Pride of Britain Awards were televised on ITV on 11 October 2005.

2006
The 8th Pride of Britain Awards were televised on ITV on 7 November 2006.

2007
The 9th Pride of Britain Awards were televised on ITV on 10 October 2007.

2008
The 10th Pride of Britain Awards were televised on ITV on 1 October 2008.

2009
The 11th Pride of Britain Awards were televised on ITV on 7 October 2009.

2010
The 12th Pride of Britain Awards were televised on ITV on 10 November 2010.

2011
The 13th Pride of Britain Awards were televised on ITV on 5 October 2011.

Panel
Christine Bleakley
Peter Willis
Johnson Beharry
Gareth Jones (Retail Director of Shop Direct Group)
Christine Beasley

2012
The 14th Pride of Britain Awards were televised on ITV on 30 October 2012.

Panel

Mark Austin
Carol Vorderman
Denise Lewis
Michael Owen
Andrea Spyropoulos
Chris Sims
Aled Jones
Marco Ivone (Head of Public Relations - Lidl GB sponsor)
David Weir

2014
The 16th Pride of Britain Awards were televised on ITV on 7 October 2014.

BOLD indicates the celebrities introduced the award

Panel

Carol Vorderman
Susanna Reid
Ben Shephard
Bernard Hogan-Howe
Andrea Spyropoulos
Nicola Adams
Sharon Gray

2015
The 17th Pride of Britain Awards were televised on ITV on 1 October 2015.

BOLD indicates the celebrities introduced the award

Panel

Carol Vorderman
Ben Shephard
Susanna Reid

2016
The 18th Pride of Britain Awards were held on 31 October 2016 and were televised on ITV on 1 November 2016. Carol Vorderman returned to present the ceremony.

Panel

Ben Shephard
Susanna Reid
Ruth Langsford
Katie Piper
Chris Hoy
Mark Austin
Sam Allardyce
Lloyd Embley

2017
The 19th Pride of Britain Awards were televised on ITV on 7 November 2017, with Carol Vorderman as host. Ashley Banjo served as a roving reporter.

Panel

Ben Shephard
Susanna Reid
Kadeena Cox
Eamonn Holmes
Katie Piper
Jane Cummings
Lloyd Embley

2018

The 20th awards were televised on ITV on 6 November 2018, again with Carol Vorderman and Ashley Banjo. The winners were:

2019  

The 2019 awardees were:

2020 
On 23 April 2020, a special award was given to Captain Tom Moore for his fund-raising efforts during the COVID-19 pandemic.

The 2020 awards proper were televised on ITV on 1 November 2020.

2021 

The 2021 awards proper were televised on ITV on 4 November 2021. Ashley Banjo was introduced as Vorderman's co-presenter.

Guest Performance: Westlife - My Hero

2022 

The 2022 awards ceremony aired on ITV on 27 October 2022 and was hosted by Carol Vorderman and Ashley Banjo 

Live performance: Joel Corry and Tom Grennan - Lionheart (Fearless)

References

External links
Pride of Britain official website
Daily Mirror
Sky Showbiz
Awards Manufacturer

British television awards
ITV (TV network) original programming
1999 establishments in the United Kingdom
Award ceremonies
Awards established in 1999